The Jake Jabs Center for Entrepreneurship is an entrepreneurial concept development center and a graduate and undergraduate-level entrepreneurial training center at the University of Colorado Denver Business School.

History
Denver philanthropist Richard Bard provided start-up funding for the Center, which was named Bard Center for Entrepreneurship in 1996.  In 2013 the Center was renamed the Jake Jabs Center For Entrepreneurship after Jake Jabs, a Denver-based furniture baron, donated $10 million to the center, largely due to his friendship with the Center's director, Professor Madhavan Parthasarathy.  As of March 2014, this was the largest single donation in the history of CU Denver's downtown campus, and the largest single donation ever made by an individual entrepreneur to a Business School department or Center.  In 2018, Mr. Jabs donated a further $2 million, increasing the value of his gift to $12 million.

Programs
The Center offers graduate and undergraduate AACSB accredited courses, with entrepreneurship being one of CU Denver's most popular MBA specializations. Furthermore, specializations in entrepreneurship are offered as part of the MS in Management, MS in Marketing, MS International Business, and MS in Information Systems programs. The Center offers several graduate and undergraduate programs, including 1) graduate MBA specialization in entrepreneurship, 2) graduate certificate in entrepreneurship, 3) graduate certificate in bio-entrepreneurship, 4) graduate international entrepreneurship certificate/badge, 5) undergraduate major in entrepreneurship for business students, 6) undergraduate minor in entrepreneurship, offered to non-business students, and finally 7) undergraduate certificate in entrepreneurship.

The Jake Jabs Center provides an accelerator program for start-up businesses. The Center also offers mentorship programs, the Best of Colorado speaker events, and its signature event  THE CLIMB Business Plan Competition. THE CLIMB is open to any Colorado collegiate team and more than $25,000 worth of monetary and in-kind prizes are awarded each year.

CLIMB competitions

2018 CLIMB Competition results

Fall 2017 Competition results

Spring 2017 Competition results

2016 Competition results

2015 Competition results

2014 Competition results

2013 Competition results

2012 Competition results

2011 Competition results

2010 Competition results

2009 Competition results

2008 Competition results

References 

University of Colorado Denver